The Roc de Gleisin is a Massif de la Chartreuse mountain located between Entremont-le-Vieux and Saint-Pierre-d'Entremont in Savoie districts. Rock bars on its western side also delimit the territory of Corbel district. The mountain is most composed of limestone.

Hike
The top of the roc de Gleisin ridge allows access to Roche Veyrand south, Col de la Cluse north or to return to the town of Saint-Pierre-d'Entremont in Savoie east.

References 

Mountains of the Alps
Mountains of Savoie